Ann Cotton (born 1950) is a Welsh philanthropist and entrepreneur.

Ann Cotton may also refer to:

Annie Cotton (born 1975), Canadian actress and singer
Ann Cotton (colonial Virginian) (fl. 1650s–1670s)

See also
Ann Cotten (born 1982), American-born German writer
 Mary Ann Cotton (1832–1873), British serial killer